Richard, Rick, or Dick Allen may refer to:

Artists
Dick Allen (poet) (1939–2017), American poet, literary critic and academic
Richard Allen (abstract artist) (1933–1999), British painter
James Moffat (author) (1922–1993), Canadian-British novelist, wrote as Richard Allen, among other pseudonyms
Richard J. Allen (writer) (born 1959), American television writer
Richard James Allen (born 1960), Australian poet, dancer and filmmaker

Sportspeople
Dick Allen (1942–2020), American baseball player
Dick Allen (footballer) (1921–1977), Australian footballer for Collingwood
Dick Allen (bowler), American ten-pin bowler 
Richard Allen (field hockey) (1902–1969), Indian field hockey player

Musicians
Richard "Pistol" Allen (1932–2002), American musician, drummer for the Funk Brothers on Motown Records
Rick Allen (drummer) (born 1963), British musician with the rock band Def Leppard
Rick Allen (keyboardist) (born 1946), American musician with The Box Tops
Rick Allen (organist) (born 1940s), American blues, rock and R&B organist and pianist
Richard Allen (born 1963), American musician, conductor, composer, performer
Richie Allen, a name used for recordings in the 1960s by Richard Podolor (1936–2022), American guitarist and record producer

Politicians
Richard Allen (Canadian politician) (born 1929), historian and politician in Ontario, Canada
Richard Allen (Irish politician), member of parliament for Harristown
Richard Allen (Texas politician) (1830–1909), Texas politician and civic leader
Richard V. Allen (born 1936), American National Security Advisor under President Ronald Reagan
Rick W. Allen (born 1951), American politician from the U.S. state of Georgia
Richard D. Allen (1938–2009), member of the Michigan House of Representatives
Richard J. Allen (politician) (born 1933), member of both houses of the Michigan Legislature

Other
Dick Allen (film editor) (1944–2007), English film editor
Richard Allen (abolitionist) (1803–1886), draper, philanthropist and abolitionist in Dublin
Richard Allen (bishop) (1760–1831), African-American bishop, founder of AME Church
Richard L. Allen (1803–1869), United States agricultural writer
Richard Allen (publisher) (1814–1884), publisher in Nottingham
Richard William Allen (1867–1955), English mechanical engineer
Rick Allen (sportscaster) (born 1969), American motorsports announcer
Richard K. Allen (born c. 1974), Anchorage district attorney
Richard Knapp Allen (1925–1992), American entomologist and marine zoologist

See also
Richard Allan, Baron Allan of Hallam (born 1966), British politician
Richard Van Allan (1935–2008), opera singer
Dick Allan (born 1939), Scottish rugby union player
Rick Allain (born 1969), North American ice hockey coach
Allan Dick (disambiguation)